The 2000 British Academy Television Awards were held on Sunday 14 May 2000. The ceremony was hosted by sportscaster Des Lynam, aired on ITV and took place at the Grosvenor House Hotel in Park Lane, London.

Winners and nominees

Programmes with multiple nominations

See also
2000 British Academy Television Craft Awards

External links
Archive of winners on official BAFTA website (retrieved February 19, 2006).
British Academy Television Awards 2000  at the Internet Movie Database.

2000
2000 awards in the United Kingdom
2000 television awards
2000 in British television
May 2000 events in the United Kingdom